National Highway 135A, commonly referred to as NH 135A is a national highway in India. It is a secondary route of National Highway 35.  NH-135A runs in the state of Uttar Pradesh in India. बमयय

Route 
NH135A connects Mirzapur-Aura, Bhadohi- Jaunpur. And Varanasi-Sindhora-Kerakat-Jaunpur-Shahganj-Akbarpur -Ayodhya in the state of Uttar Pradesh.

This is a section of Lumbini-Dudhi Road also known as Nawab Yusuf road.

NH 135A intersects Purvanchal Expressway in Baramadpur village situated in border of Sultanpur and Azamgarh district.

Junctions 

  Terminal near Mirzapur.
  near Aurai
  near Bhadohi
  near Jaunpur
  near Akbarpur
  Terminal near Ayodhya.

See also 
 List of National Highways in India
 List of National Highways in India by state

References

External links 

 NH 135A on OpenStreetMap

National highways in India
National Highways in Uttar Pradesh